World Be Live is a live album by the English synthpop duo Erasure, released by Mute Records in 2018. The album is the third in a trilogy of releases, following studio albums World Be Gone in 2017 and World Beyond in 2018.

The 24-track live album was culled from two concerts at the Eventim Apollo in February 2018, which was part of the World Be Gone tour.

Critical reception

Upon release, Marcy Donelson of AllMusic praised the "well-curated mix" of songs on the album and described Bell as giving an "emotive performance". Classic Pop considered the live material a "nostalgic celebration" and highlighted Bell's "entertaining interjections". They concluded: "It's abundantly clear, as the World Be... trilogy concludes, that Erasure have lost none of their sparkle."

Track listing

Personnel
Erasure
 Andy Bell – vocals
 Vince Clarke – synthesizers

Production
 Will Shapland – mixing, recording
 Alex Wharton – mastering

Other
 P.A. Taylor – art direction
 Louise Hendy – painting
 Andy Sturmey – photography

Charts

References

2018 live albums
Erasure live albums
Mute Records live albums